A hotel thief is someone who steals items from the rooms of guests at a hotel.

Several factors may attract a thief to a hotel. Rooms are generally empty for most of the day, with few hiding places for valuable possessions outside of a hotel's safe, which not all guests make use of. Furthermore, it is comparatively easy for a thief to leave a hotel without arousing suspicion, as guests are continually coming and going with luggage.

Although hotel room security has improved, with more advanced locks, this has not eradicated hotel theft. A thief can enter a room without needing to pick a lock, for example by pretending to be a guest who has left their key in their room. Items can also be taken while a guest is distracted, for example when checking in.

One of the most prolific hotel thieves was Ernest Le Ford, who stole thousands of dollars' worth of jewels from hotels in New York City in the early part of the twentieth century, including taking $8000 worth from a room at the Manhattan Square Hotel. Another nineteenth-century hotel thief successfully stole $60,000 worth of gold dust from a San Francisco hotel.

Hotel guests can be considered as hotel thieves as well. CNN reported on a survey of 1,157 four- and five-star hoteliers, which items are stolen the most by guests. An astonishing 49 hotels reported that mattresses had been stolen from their premises.

References

Hotels
Theft